Outta Season is a 1969 album by Ike & Tina Turner, released on Blue Thumb Records in the US and Liberty Records in the UK. The album contains their signature live song "I've Been Loving You Too Long."

Content and release 
Outta Season is a heavy blues album produced by Tina Turner and Bob Krasnow. The controversial album cover features the Turners (Ike on the front and Tina on the back) in whiteface eating watermelon. The art direction was by Tom Wilkes and photography by Barry Feinstein. As a sarcastic statement, Amos and Andy are credited for the design & photography on the album due to the history of the characters being portrayed by white actors wearing blackface in the film Check and Double Check.

The album contains the track "I Am a Motherless Child," which is based on the spiritual "City Called Heaven". The first single, "I've Been Loving You Too Long," peaked at No. 68 on the Billboard Hot 100 and No. 23 on the Billboard R&B chart in April 1969. The second single "Crazy 'Bout You Baby" was only released in the UK.

Critical reception 

Cash Box (March 29, 1969)The 'now' sound is blues, and the blues are now the sound of Ike and Tina Turner. This newly-recorded set features the vet R&B/Pop duo in a more contemporary framework than ever before, with increase emphasis on instrumental happenings. Material includes such blues standards as "Honest I Do," "My Babe," "Rock Me Baby," "Crazy 'Bout You Baby" and "Mean Old World" as well as several Ike or Tina originals and Otis Redding's "I've Been Loving You Too Long."

Track listing

Chart performance

References 

1969 albums
Ike & Tina Turner albums
Albums produced by Ike Turner
Blue Thumb Records albums
Liberty Records albums
Blues albums by American artists
Soul albums by American artists